You'll Sing a Song and I'll Sing a Song is an album by folk singer Ella Jenkins.  She is joined by members of the Urban Gateways Children's Chorus. It was later added into the National Recording Registry. The composition "You'll Sing a Song and I'll Sing a Song" was added to the National Recording Registry by the Library of Congress in 2007.

Track listing
 "You'll Sing a Song and I'll Sing a Song" (Ella Jenkins) – 4:20
 "Shabot Shalom" (Traditional) – :46
 "Cadima" (Traditional) – 1:37
 "This Train" (Traditional) – 3:02
 "Did You Feed My Cow?" (Traditional) – 3:12
 "Miss Mary Mack" (Traditional) – 1:56
 "May-Ree Mack" (Jenkins, Traditional) – 2:11
 "You'll Sing a Song and I'll Sing a Song (Review)" – 2:41
 "Dulce, Dulce" (Jenkins) – 1:16
 "May-Ree Mack (Review)" – 2:18
 "Maori Indian Battle Chant" :31
 "Did You Feed My Cow? (Review)" – 2:33
 "I Saw" (Jenkins) – 2:20
 "Sifting in the Sand" (Traditional) – 1:10
 "Guide Me" (Traditional) – 3:02

Personnel
Ella Jenkins – vocals, harmonica, ukulele, guitar
Urban Gateways Children's Chorus – choir

References

1966 albums
Ella Jenkins albums
Folkways Records albums
United States National Recording Registry recordings
United States National Recording Registry albums